Pterospondylus (meaning "winged vertebra") is a dubious genus of theropod dinosaur from the Late Triassic. It was a coelophysid theropod which lived in what is now Germany (Trossingen Formation). The type species, Pterospondylus trielbae, (derived from "Tri", in reference to the Triassic period, and "Elba", for the Elbe River area), was described by Jaekel in 1913-14 for a single back vertebra found inside the shell of the Proganochelys turtle.  Sometimes, it is aligned with Procompsognathus, or even considered to be synonymous with it, despite being based on a vertebra that is twice the size of the corresponding bone in Procompsognathus. P. trielbae has no diagnostic features and is therefore considered a nomen dubium.

References 

Coelophysoids
Norian life
Late Triassic dinosaurs of Europe
Triassic Germany
Fossils of Germany
Fossil taxa described in 1913
Taxa named by Otto Jaekel
Nomina dubia